David Friess is a Republican member of the Illinois House from the 116th district since January 13, 2021. The 116th district, located in part of the Metro East, includes all or parts of Baldwin, Cahokia, Chester, Columbia, Coulterville, Cutler, Darmstadt, Du Quoin, Dupo, East Carondelet, Ellis Grove, Evansville, Fayetteville, Floraville, Fults, Hecker, Kaskaskia, Lenzburg, Maeystown, Marissa, Millstadt, New Athens, Paderborn, Percy, Pinckneyville, Prairie du Rocher, Red Bud, Rockwood, Ruma, Sauget, Smithton, Sparta, St. Libory, Steeleville, Tilden, Valmeyer, Waterloo, and Willisville.

Friess was elected to the district after defeating appointed Democratic incumbent Nathan Reitz.

Early life, education, and career
Friess was born in Southern Illinois and grew up in Chester. He attended and graduated from Chester High School. Immediately after graduating, Friess joined the United States Air Force as an aircraft mechanic. After completing his active duty obligation, he joined the Air Force Reserves as a flight engineer and crew chief of the Lockheed C-141 Starlifter and stationed in Charleston, South Carolina. During his time in the reserves, he served in the Gulf War. After retiring from the Air Force, Friess worked for Delta Air Lines in Atlanta briefly as an aircraft mechanic. He earned his Bachelor of Science in Criminal Justice from Mercer University and earned his Juris Doctor from Atlanta's John Marshall Law School. He is a member of the Randolph County Bar Association.

As of July 3, 2022, Representative Friess is a member of the following Illinois House committees:

 Appropriations - Public Safety Committee (HAPP)
 Elementary & Secondary Education: School Curriculum & Policies Committee (HELM)
 Judiciary - Criminal Committee (HJUC)
 Natural Gas Subcommittee (HPUB-NGAS)
 Public Utilities Committee (HPUB)
 State Government Administration Committee (HSGA)

Political career

2018
Friess first ran for the 116th district in the 2018 Illinois House of Representatives election. He ran unopposed in the primary and in the general election ran against Democratic then-incumbent Jerry Costello II. He lost in the general election by an 8-point margin.

2020
In 2019, Friess' previous opponent Costello was appointed by Governor J. B. Pritzker as director of law enforcement for the Illinois Department of Natural Resources. Democrat Nathan Reitz, son of Dan Reitz (the state Representative of the district before Costello), was appointed to fill Costello's remaining term. Friess ran again for the district in a crowded Republican primary. His fellow primary opponents were David Holder, a CPA and governmental auditor, and Kevin Schmidt, a chiropractor. Friess won the nomination with 41.51% of the vote. He faced off against Reitz in the general election. He improved over his previous margin by defeating appointed incumbent Reitz by a 30-point margin.

Electoral history

Personal life
Friess and his wife Miki currently reside in Red Bud, Illinois with their two children. He is a member of Ebenezer Church in Rockwood, Illinois. He is a member of the Red Bud VFW and the Chester American Legion. He currently coaches for his children in youth sports.

References

External links
Representative David Friess (R) at the Illinois General Assembly
Constituent Website

21st-century American politicians
Atlanta's John Marshall Law School alumni
Republican Party members of the Illinois House of Representatives
Mercer University alumni
Living people
1960s births
Year of birth uncertain